The Flaming Lips with Prefuse 73 is a four-track collaboration EP with Guillermo Scott Herren (a.k.a. Prefuse 73) pressed on randomly colored 12" vinyls so that no two look alike. Limited to 1000-2000 copies, it was self-produced, self-released, and only sold at select record stores. Some copies were hand assembled and autographed by vocalist Wayne Coyne.  The song "Supermoon Made Me Want to Pee" was later released on The Flaming Lips and Heady Fwends.

Track listing

References

The Flaming Lips EPs
Prefuse 73 EPs
Warner Records EPs
2011 EPs
Collaborative albums